Caitlin De Ville (born March 9, 1989) is a Zambian electric violinist based in Cape Town, South Africa. She released her debut album Serengeti Sunrise in 2017. A popular touring musician, De Ville has toured as a solo artist and with bands like Turisas.

Biography 
De Ville was born in the city of Chingola in the Zambian copperbelt and raised in the nearby city of Kitwe. She moved to Cape Town at age eighteen.

De Ville started uploading videos to YouTube in 2009, and her violin covers of popular songs gained online popularity during the 2010s. By 2018 her channel was one of the top ten YouTube channels in South Africa. As of July 2022, she has more than 235 million views on her YouTube videos and remains one of the most subscribed to creators in South Africa.

In 2019, she began touring with the Finnish metal band Turisas.

Discography

Albums

Singles

References 

Living people
Zambian musicians
Musicians from Cape Town
Electric violinists
People from Chingola
People from Kitwe
White Zambian people
Zambian emigrants to South Africa
South African YouTubers
Music YouTubers
1989 births